

Champions
World Series: Philadelphia Athletics over Chicago Cubs (4-1)

Awards and honors
Chalmers Award
Ty Cobb, Detroit Tigers, OF
Nap Lajoie, Cleveland Naps

MLB statistical leaders

Major league baseball final standings

American League final standings

National League final standings

Events
April 14 – William Howard Taft became the first U.S. president to throw out the ceremonial "first pitch" after he opened the 1910 season at Washington's League Park. Washington Senators' Walter Johnson christened the tradition by pitching a one-hitter, beating the Philadelphia Athletics, 3-0.
April 20 – Addie Joss of the Cleveland Naps pitches the second no-hitter of his career defeating the Chicago White Sox, 1-0. Joss was the last major leaguer to throw a no-hitter, when he tossed a perfect game on October 2, 1908. That game was also a 1-0 win over the White Sox.
May 12 – Chief Bender throws a no-hitter for the Philadelphia Athletics, coming within one walk of a perfect game. Philadelphia beats the Cleveland Naps, 4-0.
June 28 – Chicago Cubs shortstop Joe Tinker steals home twice becoming the first major leaguer to accomplish the feat in Cubs' 11–1 home victory over the Cincinnati Reds. Mordecai Brown is the winning pitcher.
July 3 – Pittsburgh Pirates outfielder Chief Wilson hits for the cycle in a 10-2 victory over the Cincinnati Reds.
July 19 – Cleveland Naps ace Cy Young wins the 500th game of his career, defeating the Washington Senators, 5-4.
August 13 — The "baseball game of perfect symmetry" took place as Brooklyn and Pittsburgh played an 8–8 tie before the game was called because of darkness.  Each team had 8 runs, 13 hits, 2 errors, 12 assists, 5 strikeouts, 3 walks, one base hit, and one passed ball.
August 18 – Rickwood Field opens in Birmingham, Alabama, with 10,000 fans watching the Birmingham Barons defeat the Montgomery Climbers in a 3-2 pitchers' duel won by Harry Coveleski.
August 25 – Philadelphia Athletics second baseman Danny Murphy hits for the cycle in a 9-6 loss to the St. Louis Browns.
September 1 - During the league's 1910 Rule 5 draft, the Chicago White Sox select infielder Buck Weaver from York in the Tri-State league. Weaver is best remembered today as one of players banned for life regarding the 1919 World Series Fix.  
September 17 – Detroit Tigers pitcher Ed Summers, a notoriously poor hitter, bounces two home runs into the stands in a 10–3 victory over the Philadelphia Athletics. The two homers, both off Harry Krause, will comprise his career total.
October 6 – Boston Doves outfielder Bill Collins hits for the cycle as Boston crushes the Philadelphia Phillies, 20-7. Collins becomes the first player in baseball history to hit for the natural cycle.
October 9 – Detroit Tigers star Ty Cobb stayed out of the lineup to preserve his .383 batting average. Cleveland Naps' Nap Lajoie went 8-for-8 in a doubleheader where six of his hits were bunt singles. He finished with a .384 batting average and rumor has it that the St. Louis Browns gave Lajoie the singles by playing too deep. American League president Ban Johnson investigated and found no wrongdoing.
October 23 – The Philadelphia Athletics defeat the Chicago Cubs, 7–2, in Game 5 of the World Series to win their first World Championship, four games to one.

Births

January
January 1 – Charlie Devens
January 3 – Frenchy Bordagaray
January 4 – Gabe Paul
January 7 – Johnny McCarthy
January 10 – Johnny Peacock
January 11 – Schoolboy Rowe
January 16 – Dizzy Dean
January 19 – Hugh Poland
January 19 – Dib Williams
January 20 – Frank Makosky
January 22 – Prince Oana
January 24 – Johnny Dickshot
January 27 – Harry Matuzak

February
February 1 – Dutch Lieber
February 10 – Bob Logan
February 14 – Alex Sabo
February 24 – Fred Sington

March
March 2 – Ace Adams
March 3 – Bill Brenzel
March 7 – Fred Archer
March 7 – Howie McFarland
March 7 – Andrew Porter
March 11 – Ernesto Aparicio
March 16 – Bob Poser
March 19 – Robert Gaston
March 27 – Vince Sherlock
March 27 – Steve Sundra
March 29 – Bill Dietrich

April
April 4 – Joe Bokina
April 4 – Joe Vosmik
April 8 – Charlie English
April 12 – Bill Miller
April 15 – Eddie Mayo
April 22 – Lew Riggs
April 24 – Sam Harshaney
April 25 – Jimmy Brown
April 27 – Frenchy Uhalt

May
May 9 – Mike Balas
May 10 – Joe Chamberlain
May 12 – Lefty Mills
May 13 – Boze Berger
May 17 – Lou Chiozza
May 19 – Tommy Thompson
May 21 – Larry Rosenthal
May 22 – Terris McDuffie
May 23 – Earl Huckleberry
May 26 – Jim McCloskey
May 28 – Willard Hershberger
May 29 – George McQuinn

June
June 6 – Chet Morgan
June 10 – Frank Demaree
June 17 – Joe Bowman
June 18 – Russ Hodges
June 23 – Bill Perrin
June 26 – Jim Henry
June 28 – Lee Gamble
June 29 – Francis Healy
June 29 – Burgess Whitehead

July
July 7 – Ernie Sulik
July 7 – Jelly Taylor
July 9 – Ray Thomas
July 16 – Bill Norman
July 17 – Sammy Holbrook
July 18 – Wes Livengood
July 19 – Harry Kinzy
July 22 – George Caithamer
July 23 – Paul Chervinko
July 25 – LeGrant Scott
July 31 – Glenn Liebhardt
July 31 – Gordon McNaughton

August
August 13 – Lou Finney
August 14 – Billy Myers
August 17 – Pat McLaughlin
August 19 – Atley Donald
August 23 – Lonny Frey
August 25 – George Cisar
August 27 – Ewald Pyle
August 28 – Jack Peerson
August 31 – Ira Hutchinson

September
September 3 – Jack Redmond
September 6 – Johnny Lanning
September 9 – Bud Thomas
September 10 – Buddy Blair
September 10 – Eddie Sawyer
September 11 – Les Tietje
September 17 – Paul Hardy
September 21 – Elden Auker
September 21 – Max Butcher
September 24 – Tom Seats
September 24 – Dixie Walker
September 26 – Joe Sullivan
September 30 – Jennings Poindexter
September 30 – Frank Skaff

October
October 3 – Bob Bowman
October 3 – Felix Evans
October 4 – Frankie Crosetti
October 8 – Wally Moses
October 12 – Walter Signer
October 18 – Skeeter Newsome
October 20 – Sammy T. Hughes
October 20 – Bob Sheppard
October 23 – Billy Sullivan
October 26 – Hugh Shelley

November
November 4 – Joe Beggs
November 6 – Chet Covington
November 7 – Bill Brubaker
November 16 – Morrie Arnovich
November 18 – Joe Cicero
November 18 – Dykes Potter
November 23 – Hal Schumacher
November 27 – Hank Miklos
November 28 – Ed Gallagher
November 28 – Bill McWilliams
November 29 – Ed Leip

December
December 9 – Steve Larkin
December 10 – Pretzel Pezzullo
December 11 – Slick Coffman
December 15 – George Stumpf
December 20 – Calvin Chapman
December 22 – Stan Klopp
December 24 – Lloyd Johnson

Deaths

January–February
January 12 – Harry Staley, 43, National League pitcher who had four 20-win seasons from 1889 to 1892 for Pittsburgh and Boston teams.
January 22 – Sam Wise, 52, infielder, mainly for the 1880s Boston National League teams, who was shortstop of the 1883 champions and batted .334 in 1887.
January 29 – Marty Barrett, 49, catcher who played in 1884 for the Boston Beaneaters of the National League and the Indianapolis Hoosiers of the American Association.
January 31 – Pidgey Morgan, 56, OF/3B and pitcher for the St. Louis Red Stockings of the National Association (1875) and  the Milwaukee Grays of the National League (1878).
February 8 – Flip Lafferty, 55, who pitched one game for the 1876 Philadelphia Athletics, and played four games in center field for the 1877 Louisville Grays.
February 8 – Cy Vorhees, 35, pitcher for the NL Philadelphia Phillies and AL Washington Senators in the season.
February 15 – Bug Holliday, 43, outfielder who hit .311 over parts of 10 seasons with the Cincinnati Red Stockings/Reds, who twice led all hitters in home runs (AA, 1889/NL, 1892) and also umpired for one season.
February 17 – Horatio Munn, 58, second baseman for the 1875 Brooklyn Atlantics of the National Association.

March–April
March 14 – Mike Hines, 47, catcher who played from 1883 to 1888 for the Boston Beaneaters, Brooklyn Grays and Providence  Grays.
March 16 – Charlie Reipschlager, 54, American Association catcher who hit .222 in 296 games for the New York Metropolitans and Cleveland Blues (1883–1887).
March 18 – Alan Storke, 25, National League infielder who played from 1906 through 1909 for the Pittsburgh Pirates and St. Louis Cardinals.
April 2 – Jim Nealon, 25, first baseman from 1906 to 1907 for the Pittsburgh Pirates, who tied with Harry Steinfeldt the National League RBI title during his rookie season.
April 9 – Bob Addy, 65, second baseman/outfielder for six different teams (1871–1877), who also managed the Philadelphia White Stockings (1875) and Cincinnati Reds (1877).
April 16 – Bill Kienzle, 48, outfielder for the Philadelphia Athletics of the American Association (1882) and the Philadelphia Keystones of the Union Association (1884).
April 16 – Tom Loftus, 53, manager of teams in Milwaukee, Cleveland, Cincinnati, Chicago and Washington, and later chairman of rules committee.
April 25 – Jim Carleton, 61, first baseman for the Cleveland Forest Citys from 1871 and 1872.

May–June
May 4 – Patrick Gillespie, 58, slugging left fielder who hit .276 with 10 home runs and 371 RBI in 714 games for the New York Giants and Troy Trojans of the National League (1880–1887).
May 25 – Bill Hassamaer, 45, outfielder who played from 1894 to 1896 for the Louisville Colonels and Washington Senators of the National League.
June 22 – Tom Doran, 29, catcher for the Boston Americans and Detroit Tigers between 1904 and 1906.

July–August
July 14 – Jack Horner, pitcher for the 1894 Baltimore Orioles of the American Association.
July 27 – Theodore Conover, 42, pitcher for the 1889 Cincinnati Red Stockings of the American Association.
August 19 – Bill Lennon, 62, National Association catcher who, on the very first major league game ever played, scored the first run and became the first catcher to throw out a baserunner attempting to steal a base (May 4, 1871).
August 31 – Duke Esper, 42, pitcher who posted a 101-110 record and a 4.39 ERA with seven different cubs between 1890 and 1898.

September–October
September 4 – Candy Nelson, 61, shortstop who  played 13 seasons between 1872 and 1890 for nine different teams in three different leagues. compiling a .253 career-average in 817 games.
September 20 – Lou Schiappacasse, 29, American League right fielder for the 1902 Detroit Tigers.
September 24 – George Boone, 39, pitcher who played with the Louisville Colonels of the American Association in 1891.
October 2 – Sandy McDougal, 36, pitcher for the Brooklyn Grooms (1895) and St. Louis Cardinals (1905).
October 6 – Lawrence Farley, 54, outfielder for the 1884 Washington Nationals of the American Association.
October 12 – George Mundinger, 55, catcher for the 1884 Indianapolis Hoosiers of the American Association.
October 20 – George Ewell, 59, outfielder who appeared in one game for the 1871 Cleveland Forest Citys of the National Association.

November–December
November 1 – Bob Pettit, 49, infielder/outfielder from 1887 to 1891 for the NL Chicago White Stockings and AA Milwaukee Brewers.
November 20 – Jack O'Brien, 50, American Association catcher/first baseman for the Philadelphia Athletics, Brooklyn Grays/Bridegrooms and Baltimore Orioles between 1882 and 1890.
November 23 – Charlie Barber, 56, third baseman for the 1884  Cincinnati Outlaw Reds of the Union Association.
December 13 – Dan McGann, 39, a three-time .300 hitter and first baseman on the New York Giants' pennant winners of 1904 and 1905, who became the first player to steal five bases in a single game (1904) –a feat not matched in the National League until Davey Lopes did it for the Los Angeles Dodgers (1974) and not surpassed until Otis Nixon of the Atlanta Braves swiped six (1991).
December 25 – John Deasley, 49, shortstop who hit .204 in 44 games for the Washington Nationals and Kansas City Cowboys of the Union Association (1884).

References